Diving at the 2023 World Aquatics Championships will be held from 14 to 22 July 2023.

Schedule
13 events will be held.

All times are local (UTC+9).

Medal summary

Medal table

Men

Women

Mixed

References

External links
 Official website

 
2023 World Aquatics Championships
Diving at the World Aquatics Championships
2023 in diving
Diving competitions in Japan